Gortyna is a moth genus in the family Noctuidae.

Species
 Gortyna basalipunctata Gaeser, 1888
 Gortyna borelii Pierret, 1837 (= Hydroecia leucographa)
 Gortyna flavago (Denis & Schiffermüller, 1775)
 Gortyna flavina Hreblay & Ronkay, 1997
 Gortyna fortis (Butler, 1878)
 Gortyna franciscae (Turati, 1913)
 Gortyna golestanensis (Fibiger & Zahiri, 2006)
 Gortyna hethitica Hacker, Kuhna & Gross, 1986
 Gortyna imitans Hreblay & Ronkay, 1997
 Gortyna joannisi (Boursin, 1928)
 Gortyna moesiaca Herrich-Schäffer, [1849]
 Gortyna osmana Hacker & Kuhna, 1986
 Gortyna plumbeata Hreblay & Ronkay, 1997
 Gortyna plumbitincta Hreblay & Ronkay, 1997
 Gortyna puengeleri (Turati, 1909)
 Gortyna rungsi (Boursin, 1963)
 Gortyna xanthenes Germar, [1842]

References
Natural History Museum Lepidoptera genus database
Gortyna at funet

External links

Hadeninae
Taxa named by Ferdinand Ochsenheimer